Spruce High School may refer to:

Spruce Creek High School, Port Orange, Florida
H. Grady Spruce High School, Dallas, Texas